Osama, alternatively Oussama and Usama, is an Arabic masculine given name.

The name derives from the Arabic stem اسم A-S-M Alif Sin Mim "name" and means more or less "the one with a name". It is one of many Arabic male given names for "lion", the lion being considered as an animal with fame. From this point of view, sama is equivalent of the Latin name Augustus, "majestic". In Hebrew the root is reduced to שם from Proto-Semitic *šim-, from Proto-Afroasiatic *(ʔi-)sim- ("name"),  each denoting some aspect of the animal. In popularity, the name has declined drastically in Britain since 2001, mainly due to negative associations with al-Qaeda founder Osama bin Laden.

People with the given name

Osama
 Osama, a former ring name of American wrestler Armando Estrada
 Osama bin Laden (1957–2011), founder of al-Qaeda
 Osama Abdusalam, Libyan football midfielder
 Osama Afifi, American bassist
 Osama Ali (born 1988), Iraqi footballer
 Osama Jamil Ali (born 1965), Kurdish politician 
 Osama Alomar (born 1968), Syrian poet
 Osama El-Baz (born 1931), Egyptian diplomat
 Osama Eldawoody, American undercover police officer
 Osama Elsamni (born 1988), Egyptian footballer born in Japan
 Osama Al Hamady (born 1975), Libyan football defender for Al-Ittihad
 Osama Hamdan (born 1965), senior member of Hamas
 Osama Hassan Ahmed, English terror suspect
 Osama Hassan (born 1979), Egyptian footballer with Ittihad
 Osama Hawsawi (born 1984), Saudi Arabian footballer
 Osama Hosny (born 1982), Egyptian footballer
 Osama Hussain (born 1971), Kuwaiti football defender
 Osama Kamal (born 1959), Egyptian engineer and politician
 Osama Al-Khurafi (born 1963), Kuwaiti fencer
 Osama Ali Maher (born 1968), Swedish conservative politician and Member of Parliament
 Osama Malik (born 1990), Australian footballer
 Osama Mazini, Palestinian politician
 Osama Mohamed (born 1979), Egyptian footballer
 Osama Mounir, Christian Egyptian TV personality
 Osama Al-Muwallad (born 1984), Saudi Arabian football defender
 Osama Nabih (born 1975), Egyptian footballer for Itesalat
 Osama Anwar Okasha (1941–2010), Egyptian screenwriter and journalist
 Osama Orabi (born 1962), Egyptian footballer
 Osama El-Rady (1930–2005), Saudi psychiatrist
 Osama Rashid (born 1992), Dutch footballer
 Osama Saad (born 1954), Lebanese politician
 Osama Saeed (born 1980), Scottish politician
 Osama Al-Zain, Palestinian filmmaker and writer

Oussama
 Oussama Assaidi (born 1988), Dutch footballer of Moroccan descent
 Oussama Cherribi (born 1959), Moroccan-Dutch sociologist and former politician for the VVD party
 Oussama Darragi (born 1987), Tunisian professional footballer
 Oussama Essabr (born 1989), Moroccan father Libyan mother footballer
 Oussama Kassir (born 1966), Lebanese-born Swedish militant Islamist
 Oussama Mellouli (born 1984), Tunisian swimmer who competes in the freestyle and medley events
 Oussama Sellami (born 1979), Tunisian football player
 Oussama Souaidy (born 1981), Moroccan football player

Usama
 Usama ibn Zayd (born 612), an early Muslim and Companion of the Prophet
 Usama Halabi (born 1959), advocate and senior lawyer in Jerusalem
 Usama Hasan, British astronomer and religious writer
 Usama Al-Kini (died 2008), Kenyan Al-Qaeda member
 Usama Muhammad (born 1954), Syrian film director and screenwriter
 Usama Mukwaya (born 1989), Ugandan screenwriter and director
 Usama Alshaibi (born 1969), Iraqi-American independent filmmaker and visual artist
 Usama Young (born 1985), New Orleans Saints cornerback
 Usama Ishtay (born 1988), Syrian-Venezuelan fashion designer
 Usamah ibn Munqidh, 12th-century Arab historian, diplomat, and warrior

See also
Ōsama

References

Arabic masculine given names